Ambodivahibe Marine Reserve is a new marine protected area that was identified during a marine Rapid assessment (RAP) in the north-east of Madagascar as an unusually rich zone for marine biodiversity.  A cool upwelling from the deep bay is thought to provide natural resilience to coral bleaching and this may explain the unusually pristine coral habitat.

The area also hosts nationally-important areas of mangrove and seagrass habitat as well as endangered marine species including sea turtles and dugongs 

Conservation International is the protected area manager although in recent years, there has only been a skeleton staff present at the site.

The Critical Ecosystem Partnership Fund has supported a number of small-scale initiatives to continue management of marine protected area since 2015.

Graine de vie is a Belgian NGO that has developed reforestation programmes for mangrove and forest habitats.

C3 Madagascar is a local NGO that has been increasingly active in the marine protected area, particularly working closely with communities and endangered species.  The NGO  received substantial funding from the European Union's Ecofish programme  in 2020 to develop community based fisheries management programme at sites in the Ambodavahibe Marine Reserve as well as Nosy Hara Marine Park on the Northwest coast of Madagascar.

References

Marine sanctuaries
Protected areas of Madagascar